Deposit Insurance and Credit Guarantee Corporation (DICGC) is a specialised division of Reserve Bank of India which is under the jurisdiction of  Ministry of Finance, Government of India. It was established on 15 July 1978 under the Deposit Insurance and Credit Guarantee Corporation Act, 1961 for the purpose of providing insurance of deposits and guaranteeing of credit facilities. 

DICGC insures all bank deposits, such as saving, fixed, current, recurring deposit for up to the limit of Rs. 500,000 of each depositor in a bank.The limit was increased from 1 lakh to 5 lakh on 4th February 2020.

Framework

The functions of the subsidiary are governed by the provisions of 'The Deposit Insurance and Credit Guarantee Corporation Act, 1961' (DICGC Act) and 'The Deposit Insurance and Credit Guarantee Corporation General Regulations, 1961' framed by the Reserve Bank of India in exercise of the powers conferred by sub-section (3) of Section 50 of the Act.

A maximum of ₹5,00,000 (after the budget of 2020-21) is insured for each user for both principal and interest amount.
If the customer has accounts in different branches of the same bank, all of those accounts are insured to a maximum of ₹5,00,000 each. 

However, if there are more accounts in same bank, all of those are treated as a single account.
The insurance premium is paid by the insured banks itself. This means that the benefit of deposit insurance protection is made available to the depositors or customers of banks free of cost.

The Corporation has the power to cancel the registration of an insured bank if it fails to pay the premium for three consecutive half-year periods.
The Corporation may restore the registration of the bank if the bank makes a request and pays all the amounts due by way of premium from the date of default together with interest.

Reforms
The Financial Sector Legislative Reforms Commission (FSLRC) was set up by the Government of India, Ministry of Finance, on 24 March 2011, to review and rewrite the legal-institutional architecture of the Indian financial sector. In its report the FSLRC recommended a regulatory structure consisting of seven agencies including a deposit insurance-cum regulatory agency (which was named as Resolution Corporation). The present DICGC will be subsumed into the Resolution Corporation (RC)  which will work across the financial system. 

Drawing on the best international practice, the FSLRC proposal involved a unified resolution corporation that will deal with an array of financial firms such as banks and insurance companies; it will not just be a bank deposit insurance corporation. It will concern itself with all financial firms which make highly intense promises to consumers, such as banks, insurance companies, defined benefit pension funds, and payment systems. 

It will also take responsibility for the graceful resolution of systemically important financial firms, even if they have no direct links to consumers.

The Government of India introduced the Financial Resolution and Deposit Insurance bill, 2017 (FRDI bill) in Lok Sabha in the Monsoon session of 2017 to bring forth these reforms. There have been many concerns with regards to the new bill such as:

 Presently the banks have to pay a sum to the DICGC as insurance premium which insures all kinds of bank deposits up to a limit of ₹5,00,000. In case a stressed bank had to be liquidated, the depositors would be paid through DICGC. Though the bill proposes the banks to pay a sum to the Resolution Corporation, it neither specifies the insured amount nor the amount a depositor would be paid. It is thus unclear how much a depositor would be paid in case of liquidation.
 The bail in clause which largely worked against the interests of the depositors (as in Cyprus).

References

External links
 DICGC

Banking in India
Subsidiaries of Reserve Bank of India
Financial services companies based in Mumbai
Deposit insurance
Corporate subsidiaries
Indian companies established in 1978
1978 establishments in Maharashtra